The SD40T-2 is a model of diesel-electric locomotive built by General Motors Electro-Motive Division in the United States. The SD40T-2 is equipped with a 16-cylinder EMD 645E3 diesel engine producing . 312 SD40T-2s were built for three railroads in the United States between April 1974 and July 1980. This locomotive and the SD45T-2 are popularly called tunnel motors, but EMD's term is SD40-2 with "cooling system modifications" because they were designed for better engine cooling in mountainous areas. The difference between this locomotive and its non-tunnel motor cousin, the SD40-2, are the radiator intakes and radiator fan grills located at the rear of the locomotive. 

This locomotive model was purchased by the Denver and Rio Grande Western Railroad, the Southern Pacific Railroad, and its subsidiary Cotton Belt. Rio Grande's version has a smaller  fuel tank.

Original purchasers

References

External links 
 

SD40T-2
C-C locomotives
Diesel-electric locomotives of the United States
Railway locomotives introduced in 1974
Freight locomotives
Standard gauge locomotives of the United States

fi:EMD SD40#EMD SD40T-2